This is a list of book sales clubs, both current and defunct.

 Book League of America
 Book of the Month Club
 Collins Crime Club
 Folio Society
 Junior Library Guild
 Left Book Club
 Literary Guild
 Mystery Book Club
 Quality Paperback Book Club
 Scholastic Corporation
 Science Fiction Book Club
 Time Reading Program
 Wissenschaftliche Buchgesellschaft

See also

Book discussion club

References

External links

Sales club
Book collecting
Bookselling
Book promotion